The Young Artist Award for Best Performance in a Daytime TV Series – Young Actress is one of the Young Artist Awards presented annually by the Young Artist Association to recognize a young actress under the age of 21, who has delivered an outstanding performance in role while working within the daytime industry.

The award first took place in October 1979 at the Sheraton Universal Hotel in Universal City, California. In 1983, it was called Best Young Actress in a Daytime Soap. In 1984, Daytime and Nighttime was combined into one category which was called Best Young Actress in a Daytime or Nighttime Television Series. In 1987 and 1988, there was no award given.

Winners and nominees

References

Awards established in 1979
Awards for young actors